The Dream Coach is a children's book by Anne Parrish. It contains four fairytale-like stories linked by the theme of a Dream Coach which travels around the world bringing dreams to children. The stories are: "The Seven White Dreams of the King's Daughter", "Goran's Dream", "A Bird Cage With Tassels of Purple and Pearls (Three Dreams of a Little Chinese Emperor)", and ""King" Philippe's Dream". The book, illustrated by Dillwyn Parrish, the author's brother, was first published in 1924 and was a Newbery Honor recipient in 1925.

A public domain online edition of The Dream Coach, a 1925 Newbery Honor Book, is available at A Celebration of Women Writers.

References

External links
 
 

1924 children's books
1924 short story collections
American children's books
Children's short story collections
Newbery Honor-winning works